The Pickering Airport Lands were expropriated in 1972 by the Government of Canada with the intention of building a second international airport to serve the city of Toronto, its metropolitan area, and the surrounding region known as the Golden Horseshoe in Ontario, Canada. As of December 2019 no operator had been selected. In 2004, the estimated cost of building the airport was reported to be approximately $2 billion, and it was anticipated that, by 2032, it would be handling up to 11.9 million passengers annually.

The plans for the airport were developed during the late 1960s and early 1970s. A large tract of land in Pickering, Uxbridge, and Markham townships was expropriated for the airport in 1972–1973. Opposition to the project was widespread. Preliminary airport construction activity was halted in 1975 when the provincial partner in the enterprise, the Government of Ontario, declared it would not build the roads or sewers needed to service the site. In 2010, the GTAA completed a Pickering Airport "Needs Assessment Study" commissioned by the federal government. The study's report recommended that the federal government retain the Pickering lands, "thereby preserving the option of building an airport, if and when required". The Canadian Owners and Pilots Association, an association of private plane owners and pilots, took exception to the methodology and conclusions of the study, arguing that "the process to implement a new airport at Pickering should be well underway right now". Transport Action Ontario, in its own response to the study report, questioned some of the study's claims and suggested that, in lieu of building a new airport, "higher-speed, electrified rail" would be a "far superior alternative" for much of the short-haul traffic currently handled by Pearson Airport.

In an announcement in June 2013, the federal government reaffirmed its intention to hold land on the site for a future airport, stating that the needs assessment study's conclusion was that the airport would be needed within the 2027–2037 time-frame. By July 2015, the federal government had permanently protected more than half of the farmland and natural habitat on the site by adding it to the Rouge National Urban Park. It announced its intention to use the remainder of the site for economic development, including a potential future airport.

In 2016 Transport Canada released the Polonsky report. It was billed as the first independent study done on the Pickering lands in a generation. Dr. Polonsky's first recommendation: Undertake the analysis required to make a decision on the need for an airport.  KPMG was then commissioned by Transport Canada to complete a million-dollar "Pickering Lands Aviation Sector Analysis". This report was expected to be released in 2019 and will be the basis for a decision on the timing of a potential future airport.

History

1969–1975
In the late 1960s, the federal government (which then owned and operated all major Canadian airports) studied expanding Malton Airport (now Toronto Pearson International Airport) to accommodate the tremendous growth in air passenger traffic anticipated in the coming decades. Strong local-community opposition to Malton's expansion caused the government to decide instead, in December 1968, to build a second Toronto airport. An Airport Planning Team spent 1969 evaluating nearly 60 sites within a 50-nautical-mile radius of Malton. The final contenders were Lake Scugog, Lake Simcoe, Orangeville, and Guelph, with the Guelph site ranked highest.

In May 1971, in a Toronto-Centred Region plan, the provincial government announced its intention to direct new growth to the east of Toronto. This eastern emphasis became a cause of friction between the federal and provincial governments: the federal government preferred an airport location to the west, the province wanted an eastern site. In an attempt to resolve the impasse, the federal government proposed a plan to build three new airports instead of one. Two small 2,000–4,000 hectare (5,000–10,000 acre) airports would be built to handle short-haul traffic, on sites previously eliminated as unsuitable for a large airport. The first of these small airports would be constructed in the west, in Beverly Township, near Hamilton, followed immediately by the second one in the east, in Pickering Township. A third airport – a large 6,000–8,000 hectare (15,000–20,000 acre) international airport – would be built later, at an undetermined location. In December 1971, the province told the federal government that it could not afford to service both a Beverly and a Pickering site and that it had committed funds to build sewer and water facilities only to the east of Toronto.

The federal government abandoned its plan for three new airports and decided instead to build one large international airport east of Toronto. On March 2, 1972, the federal Minister of Transport announced the construction of a "major airport" in Pickering, while the Treasurer of the Province of Ontario simultaneously announced plans for a new satellite city, called Cedarwood, to be built immediately south of the airport. The federal government expropriated about 7,530 hectares (18,600 acres) of farmland for the airport, as well as the village of Brougham and the hamlet of Altona.

Expropriation went ahead despite widespread public opposition and the Province's ongoing concerns. In September 1975, airport construction was halted when the Government of Ontario withdrew its agreement to provide the necessary infrastructure for the site.

A similar major land expropriation had taken place in 1969, north of Montreal, for Montréal–Mirabel International Airport. Phase I of Mirabel opened in 1975, the same year that construction on the Pickering project was stopped.

The federal government retained its ownership of the lands expropriated for the Pickering airport, reserving the option to revive the project at some point in the future.

1976–present
After the airport construction was stopped, the federal government began to lease the site's farmland and houses to tenants, some of them former owners of the properties. This practice continued, and there were no significant developments until 2001, when Transport Canada resurrected the airport idea and commissioned the GTAA to "undertake interim planning work that would enable the federal government to determine if it should proceed with a regional/reliever airport on the Pickering Lands". As the study got under way, the federal government designated the land as an airport site. In 2002, the federal government announced a plan to preserve 3,051 hectares (7,540 acres) of the site, no longer needed for the airport, as green space in perpetuity, providing a corridor of land connecting the Rouge Park with the Oak Ridges Moraine. Management and protection details of the Federal Green Space plan were never formalized. In November 2004, the GTAA submitted its Pickering Airport Draft Plan Report to Transport Canada. The plan was for a large three-runway reliever airport. The report also referred to the long history of agricultural activity on the Pickering lands and noted that the "fertile soils have led to the majority of the land being classified as Class 1 or 2 in the Canada Land Inventory soil capability classification for agriculture".

The draft plan went into limbo when Transport Canada announced on May 9, 2007, that the GTAA had now been commissioned to complete "a needs assessment study for a potential Pickering airport". The Needs Assessment Study: Pickering Lands, Final Report was submitted to Transport Canada in March 2010. After a "due diligence review", Transport Canada released the report to the public on July 11, 2011. The study concluded that an additional airport would be needed "but it is not expected to be required before 2027 and possibly not before 2037". The study recommended that the federal government "retain and protect the site, thereby preserving the option of building an airport, if and when required".

On June 11, 2013, the federal finance minister announced revised plans for the Pickering airport lands, stating that the Government of Canada would set aside an area in the southeast, of about 3,500 hectares (8,700 acres), for a future airport that would be needed in the 2027–2037 time-frame.
 About 2,000 hectares (5,000 acres) in York Region would be transferred to Parks Canada, to become part of the new Rouge National Urban Park. The remaining land, approximately 2,000 hectares (4,900 acres), was earmarked for economic development.

On April 1, 2015, Transport Canada transferred to Parks Canada a total of 1,911 hectares (4,722 acres) of the Federal Lands, the first tract of land to become part of the Rouge National Urban Park. Parks Canada has been working closely with tenants on that land and has made it clear that agriculture will be one of the central pillars of the new Park.

On July 11, 2015, the Prime Minister announced that the federal government is transferring an additional 2,100 hectares (5,200 acres) in Pickering and Uxbridge to the Rouge National Urban Park. More than half of the farmland, streams, and natural habitat expropriated in 1972–1973 will now be permanently protected. The Prime Minister also said that the federal government intends to use the remaining lands for economic development, adding: "But let there be no doubt. Our Government will only support projects on these lands, including an airport, if they are backed by a sound business plan and if they are in the best interests of this community."

On July 13, 2015, the federal Minister of Transport reaffirmed that the remaining lands were being retained for economic development, including a potential future airport, and indicated that an independent advisor will be appointed to consult with local public and private interests on potential economic opportunities on the site, including a future airport, and will report back to the government within 12 months. Meanwhile, Transport Canada will assess future aviation needs across the Greater Golden Horseshoe to determine if there is a business case for a future airport, confirming that no decisions have been made on the development or timing of a potential future airport.

On July 18, 2015, Transport Canada released proposed revised Pickering Airport Site Zoning Regulations for the retained lands, to ensure that development on surrounding lands remains compatible with a potential future airport site.

The farmland all across the site continues to be farmed by tenants, as it has been since the land was expropriated.

Controversy

Pickering site selection
The selection process of the site for the new airport was controversial as all candidate locations were opposed by the local residents. The 1974 Gibson inquiry did review the process and found "No new evidence to suggest that Pickering site was not appropriate" (pp. 29–32, Airport Inquiry Commission, Justice Hugh Gibson). Local residents and several newspapers disagreed. It was claimed that In June 1971, a federal Department of Transport team, having visited the Pickering site with a consultant, reported that a Pickering airport would disrupt community development plans and destroy "high quality farmland", that the rolling countryside would be costly to level, and that the town of Claremont would have to be phased out. Furthermore, the site offered no room for expansion. It was suitable for a two-runway airport, with four runways possible "but with considerably greater difficulty". In August 1971, Ontario planners came to similar conclusions, stating that a Pickering airport would prevent the creation of two planned towns called Brock and Audley, destroy an area designated as a provincial agricultural and recreational preserve, and "have a major influence on the operation of Toronto International". Despite the site's drawbacks, which had led to Pickering's elimination early in the original site selection process, the federal announcement of March 1972, described Pickering as an "excellent" site. This was not the case. The Pickering site was chosen because it was the only site left in the provincially preferred area east of Toronto, after Lake Scugog had been disqualified for being too far out, too costly to develop, too important a recreational area to disrupt, and too prone to poor weather. The Lake Scugog site had also been described as "unfavourable, as the majority of users, as well as Malton airport itself, are separated from the site by Metropolitan Toronto". The argument helped to eliminate Lake
Scugog but was never used against Pickering, although it is claimed that it applied there equally well.

Political decisions favouring a new airport over expansion of the existing airport
Well into the 1970s, the Department of Transport remained adamant that Malton could not be expanded, citing noise and safety concerns. However, there were also political reasons behind the federal government's wish to build a second airport. Representatives of the local anti-airport protest group, People or Planes, meeting in Ottawa in 1972 with Transport Minister Jean Marchand, were told by him that he did not want to be the "French Canadian who could be accused of not giving an airport to Ontario after having given one to Quebec [Mirabel]". Together with Minister Marchand's desire to give Toronto what he had just given Montreal, there was the advice of chief consultant Philip Beinhaker, of Peat Marwick and Partners, who, while admitting a preference for expanding Malton, had pronounced the expansion "politically unsaleable", in part because Malton and a vocal group of anti-expansion residents there were in Premier-in-waiting William Davis's electoral riding.

Within months of the halt to construction at Pickering, new federal Transport Minister Otto Lang was announcing that no new air carriers would be allowed at Malton for at least five years. Malton's general manager accused federal officials of stalling improvements to the airport as a way of making Ontario reverse its position and provide support infrastructure for Pickering after all. In November 1978, Minister Lang told the House of Commons that Malton would not be expanded, and a study into a possible fourth runway was stopped.

The interdiction did not last. Over the years, Toronto Pearson International has been expanded to five runways, with a sixth runway planned.

Air passenger forecast inaccuracies
Numerous studies were undertaken in the late 1960s to determine whether Canada's airports could deal with future air passenger volumes. At Malton, passenger numbers in 1970 totalled 6.4 million, but consultants' forecasts for the turn of the century ranged from 25 million to 198 million. The federal government's plans for Malton and Pickering were ultimately based on an anticipated 60 million to 96 million passengers through Toronto by 2000. In 2000, Toronto Pearson International processed about 28 million passengers. By 2003, owing to international crises, that number had dropped to just over 24 million. By 2014, passenger numbers had climbed to nearly 39 million, about 62% of the 62 million passengers the GTAA is currently forecasting for Pearson by 2032.

Expropriation breach of faith
Thousands of acres of private property were expropriated in 1972 expressly for a large, public, international airport that the federal government said would be operational by 1979. The airport was never built, but the expropriated land was retained by the government. In 2004, the plan for a large international airport became a plan for a smaller, regional/reliever airport, to be operational in 2012. However, that airport was never built either. There were indications, triggered by the federal finance minister's comments in June 2013, that the aim might be smaller still: a little Pickering airport to replace Buttonville Airport when it closed. Buttonville is a privately owned corporate jet and general aviation airport – the kind of small airport the federal government, under its 1994 National Airports Policy, neither owns, operates, nor subsidizes.

The Expropriation Act is a blunt instrument of last resort, not intended to be used by the Crown to seize citizens' private property for a specific "public work" and then give or sell that property to other citizens for their private uses and benefit should the "public work" not proceed. Airport opponents and farmland proponents argue that the federal government would be guilty of a breach of faith with regard to the Pickering site should it choose a way out that differs from the one chosen for the excess lands at Mirabel, also expropriated for an international airport but never needed: the Mirabel lands were returned to their original use, which, as at Pickering, was farming.

Community opposition
There has been significant community opposition to a Pickering airport, originally led by People or Planes, then by V.O.C.A.L. (Voters Organized to Cancel the Airport
Lands), and since 2005, by Land Over Landings.

General aviation community concerns
There is strong support for Pickering Airport from COPA flight 44 Canadian Owners and Pilots Association also known as the Buttonville Flying Club. Both the Friends of Pickering Airport and an older 2011 privately funded proposal to build a not for profit Airpark in Pickering originated from this General Aviation community. This community of pilots supports keeping all nearby airports open including Buttonville, Oshawa and Markham. The Markham Airport, home to the Canadian Air Land Sea Museum, is the most at risk as it is right next door and under the approach to runway 10R at the new airport. In addition part of Markham airport, including half of its only runway, was originally expropriated for the Pickering airport. Questions on if the construction of the Pickering Airport next to an existing airport (Markham CNU8) would violate the Aeronautical Act have been raised by the airports opponents. The Markham Airport, has been around since 1965 and is currently looking to expand to a 6,000 ft runway and take-on the new role of private aviation airport if the closure of Buttonville Airport takes place. The land that Buttonville Airport sits on has been sold for development to Cadillac Fairview. No firm date for Buttonvilles closure has been announced. The city of Oshawa has passed a resolution in council affirming that Oshawa airport will remain open until 2032 or longer. There are no operational and physical constraints that would inhibit Oshawa airport from operating when Pickering opens.

In the draft plan presented by the GTAA in 2004, it proposed closing all three GA airport to jumpstart traffic at Pickering airport. Mixing the displaced general aviation traffic with increased heavy passenger jet traffic is a concern to many small aircraft pilots who would have no choice but to use the new airport, as larger airports tend to be less GA friendly, and more difficult for student pilot training.

2015 federal election issue
The future of the Pickering Airport Lands became an election issue in the 2015 Canadian federal election. In local candidate meetings only local Conservative candidates expressed support for building an airport on the lands, with the NDP, Liberal and Green candidates expressing opposition.

2018 municipal election issue
The future of the Pickering Airport Lands became an election issue in the 2018 Durham Region municipal elections when it was debated whether building a new airport in the Pickering-Ajax area could be a worthwhile economic driver for the region. Most Mayoral candidates, with the exception of the incumbent, Ryan, were opposed to its building or were undecided,

Location
The airport, as proposed in June 2013, would be located in the north-central part of Pickering, directly north-east of Toronto and about 65 km (40 mi) east of Toronto Pearson International Airport. The airport landing approach surfaces, as it is now zoned, will have aircraft flying a center line just north of Markham, just south of Stouffville onto runways 10L and 10R, west of Uxbridge, over part of Ajax onto runway 32 and over part of north Whitby onto runway 28R and 28L. The remnants of the hamlet of Altona and the village of Brougham are situated entirely within the expropriated area. The closest large communities are Claremont (an exurban village of around 2,800 residents, located northeast of the airport lands in Pickering), Stouffville and Markham.

A significant fifteenth-century Huron ancestral village on the airport site (the Draper Site) was completely excavated in 1975 and 1978 in anticipation of the airport's construction.

See also
 List of airports in the Greater Toronto Area

Notes

References

Bibliography

External links
 Transport Canada, Pickering Lands Internet Site, and Pickering Airport Site Zoning Regulations
 Land Over Landings
 Pickering Airpark a not for profit partnership founded by key members of the Buttonville aviation business community 
 the Friends of Pickering Airport, a group of volunteers advocating for the airport
 Airport World, Toronto area will need a new airport from 2027 onwards

Airports in Ontario
Proposed airports
Proposed transport infrastructure in Canada
Transport in Pickering, Ontario